National Route 378 is a national highway of Japan connecting Iyo, Ehime and Uwajima, Ehime in Japan, with a total length of 124.1 km (77.11 mi).

References

National highways in Japan
Roads in Ehime Prefecture